Mochizuki Chiyome (望月 千代女), also known as Mochizuki Chiyojo (望月 千代女) or Mochizuki Chiyo (望月 千代), was a 16th-century Japanese poet and noblewoman. She is known for creating a group of kunoichi in service of the Takeda clan.

Biography
Chiyome, a descendant of the 15th-century ninja Mochizuki Izumo-no-Kami of the Kōga-ryū, was the wife of Mochizuki Moritoki, a samurai lord of Shinano's Saku District and himself a distant relative of Izumo-no-Kami. After Moritoki was killed in the Fourth Battle of Kawanakajima, Chiyome was left in the care of the daimyō Takeda Shingen, the leader of the Takeda clan and an uncle of her late husband. It was then when Takeda approached her and tasked her with creating an underground network of kunoichi (female ninja) for use against rival warlords.

Takeda's plan was to have fully trained female operatives who could act as spies and agents used to gather information and deliver coded messages to his allies; Mochizuki was the best candidate for this, since she came from a long line of Kōga ninja. She accepted the task, set up her operation in the village of Nezu (祢津村) in the Shinshū region (present-day Tōmi, Nagano), and searched for potential candidates. Mochizuki recruited sex workers, victims of the Sengoku civil wars, and orphaned young girls. They were trained to become information gatherers, seductresses, messengers, and assassins, and were also taught the skills of a miko, which allowed them to travel without suspicion. Over time, her kunoichi learned to effectively use more disguises such as actresses, sex workers, or geisha, which allowed them to move freely within villages, towns, castles, and temples. 

Eventually, Chiyome and her kunoichi had set up an extensive network of some 200–300 agents that served the Takeda clan. Shingen was always informed of all activities, putting him one step ahead of his opponents at all times until his mysterious death in 1573, after which Mochizuki disappeared from historical records.

Historicity
It has been alleged that Mochizuki's name first appeared the 1971 book Investigation of Japanese History (考証日本史) by non-academic Shisei Inagaki (稲垣史生). Inagaki:

 Describes the details of the Fourth Battle of Kawanakajima. 
 Claims that Moritoki Mochizuki was a husband of Chiyome and that he died at this battle. 
 Presents a historical written permission to Chiyome issued by Shingen and claims that, due to this permission, the "miko village" emerged. 
 Claims that the miko of the village became spies. 
 Claims that Chiyome then became a ninja.

However, Katsuya Yoshimaru (吉丸雄哉), an associate professor of Mie University who studies Japanese Edo period literature and the ninja, claims that Chiyome did not actually exist and lists the allegedly erroneous points of Inagaki's book:
 There is no historical document describing the details of this battle.
 Moritoki did not die in this battle.
 This written permission is not extant. Generally speaking, most of such kind of written permissions are forged ones.
 The claim of spy activities of the miko is groundless; it is based only on guess of Inagaki.
 This is groundless as well. Although Inagaki refers History of Japanese Miko (日本巫女史), 1930, written by Taro Nakayama (中山太郎), this book says nothing about ninja and all mentions first appear in Inagaki's book.

Mochizuki's name became popular after a two-page article about her was published in a 1991 special issue of the magazine History Reader (歴史読本) titled Extraordinary Special Issue: All the Definitive Types of Ninja (臨時増刊号『決定版「忍者」の全て』). This article said that she was an upper ninja (上忍); according to Yoshimaru, historically there was no such rank in a ninja hierarchy.

In popular culture
Mochizuki is featured in many video games, some of which include Nobunaga's Ambition: Souzou (DLC), Puzzle & Dragons, and Toukiden: The Age of Demons. 

She is mentioned as a trainer of the playable character Kunoichi in Samurai Warriors, and appears in person in Samurai Warriors 2 as Shingen's mistress and the master and surrogate mother of Kurenai, the protagonist of Red Ninja: End of Honor. Mochizuki appears in Assassin's Creed: Memories, where she is recruited by the Templars after Shingen's death and becomes an enemy of Hattori Hanzō, and in Onimusha Soul, in which she works with the evil Genma and appears in several different forms, ages, and art styles. She is a non-playable character using Ground and Dark type pokémon in Pokémon Conquest, and elite versions of generic "Kunoichi" enemies in Marvel: Avengers Alliance are named "Chiyome". Innocent World (Japanese version of Aura Kingdom) offered a catgirl version of Chiyome as a player character, and another game has her in a full cat form. In Sangoku Taisen, she is voiced by Miyuki Sawashiro. She also appears as an Assassin-class Servant in Fate/Grand Order. In the videogame series Shadow Tactics: Blades of the Shogun, the character Aiko comes from a kunoichi clan run by a "Lady Chiyo".

Yatsuko Tanami played her in the film Sanada Yukimura no Bōryaku. She appears as a major character in David Kudler's young-adult historical novel Risuko.

References

16th-century Japanese people
Japanese ninjutsu practitioners
Japanese nobility
Miko
Ninja
Women of medieval Japan
16th-century Japanese women
Women in 16th-century warfare
Japanese women in warfare
Female wartime spies
People of Sengoku-period Japan